This was the first edition of the tournament.

Suzan Lamens and Quirine Lemoine won the title, defeating Amina Anshba and Anastasia Dețiuc in the final, 6–4, 6–3.

Seeds

Draw

Draw

References
Main Draw

Amstelveen Women's Open - Doubles